The following is the list of Miami Hurricanes football seasons by Miami Hurricanes football program.

Seasons

Notes

References

Lists of college football seasons
Miami-related lists
Miami Hurricanes football